Anton Viktorovych Kryvotsyuk (born 20 August 1998) is a Ukrainian-born Azerbaijani footballer who plays as a defender for Daejeon Hana Citizen and the Azerbaijan national team.

Career
Kryvotsyuk made his international debut for Azerbaijan on 25 March 2019, starting in the friendly match against Lithuania, which finished as a 0–0 draw.

Career statistics

International

Honours
Neftçi
Azerbaijan Premier League: 2020–21

References

External links
 
 
 
 
 

1998 births
Living people
Azerbaijani footballers
Association football defenders
Footballers from Kyiv
Azerbaijani people of Ukrainian descent
Naturalized citizens of Azerbaijan
Azerbaijan youth international footballers
Azerbaijan under-21 international footballers
Azerbaijan international footballers
Neftçi PFK players
Wisła Płock players
Daejeon Hana Citizen FC players
Azerbaijan Premier League players
K League 1 players
Ekstraklasa players
Azerbaijani expatriate footballers
Expatriate footballers in Poland
Azerbaijani expatriate sportspeople in Poland
Expatriate footballers in South Korea
Azerbaijani expatriate sportspeople in South Korea